Bianca Balti (born 19 March 1984) is an Italian model.

Career
Balti was first booked for the cover of L'Officiel, shot by Alexi Lubomirski. Her first notable advertisement campaign came for Dolce & Gabbana. She has appeared on the covers of many fashion magazines, including Vogue, Harper's Bazaar, W, Cosmopolitan and Marie Claire, as well as men's magazine Playboy. Her campaigns include Roberto Cavalli, Donna Karan, Christian Dior, D&G, Valentino, Armani Jeans, Missoni, Rolex, Guess?, Paco Rabanne, Anna Molinari, Guerlain, Revlon, La Perla, Cesare Paciotti, Mango, and Thierry Mugler.

She also appeared in the Victoria's Secret Fashion Show 2005 and in their catalogs.

Since the spring/summer 2005 fashion shows, she has appeared shows for designers such as Shiatzy Chen, Karl Lagerfeld, Gianfranco Ferré, Marc Jacobs, Alexander McQueen, Givenchy, Zac Posen, Hermès, John Galliano, Gucci, Fendi, Prada, Valentino, Missoni, Chanel, Christian Dior, Versace, Oscar de la Renta, Narciso Rodriguez, Ralph Lauren, Carolina Herrera and Victoria's Secret.

Balti was cast in Abel Ferrara's movie Go Go Tales (2008) as one of the erotic dancers. After the movie and her pregnancy, she returned to the catwalk, became the new face of the Cesare Paciotti international campaign, and replaced Angelina Jolie as one of the faces of the fall St. John campaign, with models Hilary Rhoda and Caroline Winberg.

She appears in the 2011 Pirelli Calendar photographed by Karl Lagerfeld. In 2011 she features in Francesco Scognamiglio's Spring/Summer 2011 campaign art directed by Akmal Shaukat photographed by Giampaolo Sgura. In 2012 she was chosen as the new face for Dolce & Gabbana together with actress Monica Bellucci. She became the face of their Light Blue fragrance in 2013. She also hosted BeastMasters for Italy.

Personal life
Balti was born in Lodi to  Bruno Balti and Mariabice Marzani.
Balti was married to Italian photographer, Christian Lucidi, with whom she has a daughter, Matilde, who was born in 2007. They divorced in 2010. On 14 April 2015, she gave birth to her second daughter Mia McRae with her boyfriend, an American named Matthew McRae. They met while she was vacationing in Marbella, Spain. They got married at the Fullerton courthouse on 1 August 2016. A year later, she and Matthew McRae renewed their vows in front of family and friends on 1 August 2017.

References

External links

 
 
 
 

Living people
1984 births
Italian female models
People from Lodi, Lombardy
Women Management models
IMG Models models